William James O'Rourke (2 April 1960 – 28 January 2002) was an English professional footballer who played as a goalkeeper. He played in The Football League for four clubs.

Playing career
O'Rourke began his career as an apprentice with Burnley, with whom he turned professional in February 1978. His debut came away at QPR in October 1979, in a match shown on Match of the Day. Burnley lost 7–0, with O'Rourke leaving the pitch in tears. However, his performance led to the Burnley Express naming him as his side's man of the match.

He went on to make 13 more league appearances for the Clarets before joining Blackpool on loan in August 1983, followed by a move to Chester City in March 1984. Just five appearances later he was back at Blackpool, this time on a permanent basis, playing every league game in the next two seasons. He was voted Player of the Year in his first full season.

In September 1986 O'Rourke joined Tranmere Rovers on loan, making a permanent switch to Prenton Park the following February (1987). He remained with the club the following season before leaving Football League circles. He then joined ICI Thornton.

O'Rourke died following a brain haemorrhage on 28 January 2002.

Honours

Blackpool

Football League Fourth Division runners-up: 1984–85 (46 apps)

References

External links
Burnley career stats
Obituary

1960 births
2002 deaths
Association football goalkeepers
Footballers from Nottingham
English footballers
English Football League players
Burnley F.C. players
Blackpool F.C. players
Chester City F.C. players
Tranmere Rovers F.C. players